Kristapor is the Armenian version of the name Christopher. Notable people with the name include:

 Kristapor Ivanyan (1920–1999), Soviet and Armenian lieutenant general
 Kristapor Kara-Murza (1853–1902), Armenian composer

Armenian masculine given names